The Journal of the Geological Society  is a peer-reviewed scientific journal published by the Geological Society of London. It covers research in all aspects of the Earth sciences.

References

External links 
 
Proceedings of the Geological Society of London, Vol 1 (1826-1833) to Vol 4 (1843-1845) available online at the Biodiversity Heritage Library
The Quarterly journal of the Geological Society of London, Vol 1 (1845) to Vol 72 (1923) available online at the Biodiversity Heritage Library

Publications established in 1826
Geology journals
Bimonthly journals
Geological Society of London academic journals
English-language journals
Academic journals published by learned and professional societies
1826 establishments in the United Kingdom